Basketbalvereniging Amstelveen was a professional basketball club based in Amstelveen, Netherlands.

History

BV Amstelveen had to wait until the 1970s to celebrate the first successes in the Dutch league. The club under the sponsorship name of Kinzo Amstelveen became back to back Dutch champions in the biennium 1975–76/1976–77(ranked first twice in a row with 29–7 and 33–3 record in the regular seasons each year). In 1976–77 season Kinzo also played in the first round of FIBA European Champions Cup where it faced in a group stage, the Belgian Racing Maes Pils Mechelen, the French Tours and the Austrian Shopping Centre Wien, with a record of two wins (both in Amstelveen) and four defeats.

Honours & achievements
Dutch League
 Winners (2): 1975–76, 1976–77
Dutch Cup
 Runners-up (1): 1978–79

Notable players 

 Owen Wells
 Dan Cramer

References

Defunct basketball teams in the Netherlands
Former Dutch Basketball League teams
Sports clubs in Amstelveen